Arayannegalude Veedu is a Malayalam film written and directed by A. K. Lohithadas. The film stars Mammootty in the lead role with Kaviyoor Ponnamma, Lakshmi Gopalaswamy, Devan, Oduvil Unnikrishnan, Siddique, Jomol, Krishna Kumar, Cochin Haneefa, Lal and Bindu Panicker in supporting roles.

Plot

Raveendranath (Mammootty), a worker at Bhilai steel plant, leads a happy family life. His small family consists of Seetha (Lakshmi Gopalaswami), his north Indian wife, and Lakshmi and Chinnu, his two daughters. Ravi fled from his home during his teenage days after being banished by his father (a strict disciplinarian) and has no connection with anyone back home. The sudden death of his colleague makes Ravi think about his roots and he makes a sudden visit to his house with his wife and kids.

At home, things have changed a lot in the past 18 years. Govindankutty Menon (Shivaji), Ravi's father had died seven years ago with a deep remorse - known to some. Rajendranath (Devan), his elder brother still isn't welcoming to Ravi due to a sibling abuse which resulted in parenting Suja. Ravi was falsely implicated in a sexual liaison with his maternal cousin, Premalatha - by his cunning elder brother Rajendran. Later in the film, Sreedharan (Oduvil Unnikrishnan), Ravi's maternal uncle and mother reveals to Ravi that, they became aware of Rajendran's treachery through Prema.

His younger brother Hari (Krishnakumar) and sister Sunanda (Bindu Panicker) are afraid that a part of the family property will be now handed over to Ravi. But Geetha (Sona Nair), another sister, is very happy to see him. After seeing him, the health of his mother (Kaviyoor Ponnamma) improves and she asks him to stay for the rest of her life knowing him not to be the cause of a heinous history in their family. In a short time, Ravi succeeds in winning the hearts of his siblings and leaves for Bhilai — this time taking his mother with him.

Cast
Mammootty as Raveendranath Menon
Lakshmi Gopalaswamy as Seetha, Ravi's wife
Kaviyoor Ponnamma as Lakshmi, Ravi's mother
Devan as Rajendranath Menon, Ravi's elder brother
Krishna Kumar as Hareendranath Menon, Ravi's younger brother
Shivaji as DIG Govindankutty Menon, Ravi's father
Siddique as Suresh Nair, Geetha's husband
Kripa as Lakshmi aka Lechu, Ravi's daughter
Oduvil Unnikrishnan as Sreedharan, Ravi's uncle
Sona Nair as Geetha, Ravi's sister
Jomol as Suja, Premaletha's daughter 
Haseena Bhanu as Neena, Hari's wife 
Lal as Sukumaran
T. P. Madhavan as Neena's father
Mayoori as Ragini, Ravi's adolescent love interest
Devi. S as Young Ragini
Cochin Haneefa as Gangadharan Sunanda's husband
Bindu Panicker as Sunanda
Reshmi Soman as Premalatha
Reena as Dr. Radha, Rajendra Menon's wife
Sreehari as Divakaran
Zeenath as Laila, Hameed's wife
Vishnuprakash as Hameed
Sathaar as Sudhakaran

Soundtrack
Music: Raveendran, Lyrics: Gireesh Puthenchery

 "Deenadayaalo Raamaa" (D) - K. J. Yesudas, Gayatri Asokan
 "Deenadayaalo Raamaa" (M) - K. J. Yesudas
 "Kaakkappoo Kaithappoo" - P. Jayachandran, Mano
 "Kaanaathe Melle" - K. J. Yesudas
 "Manassin Manichimizhil" (F) - K. S. Chitra
 "Manassin Manichimizhil" (M) - K. J. Yesudas

References

External links 
 

2000 films
2000s Malayalam-language films
Films with screenplays by A. K. Lohithadas
Films directed by A. K. Lohithadas
Films scored by Raveendran